"Mistake" (stylized as "mistake") is a song by American electronica musician Moby. It was released as the third single from his ninth studio album Wait for Me on September 14, 2009. The first official music video for the song was animated by Robert Powers. Two alternate music videos were also directed by Yoann Lemoine and Katy Baugh, respectively.

Track listing 
 12-inch single 
 "Mistake"  – 7:14
 "Mistake"  – 3:43
 "Mistake"  – 4:55
 "Mistake"  – 6:13

 Digital single – remixes
 "Mistake"  – 3:46
 "Mistake"  – 7:14
 "Mistake"  – 4:55
 "Mistake"  – 7:54
 "Mistake"  – 6:13
 "Mistake"  – 8:10
 "Mistake"  – 6:16
 "Mistake"  – 6:49
 "Mistake"  – 3:14
 "Mistake"  – 3:39
 "Mistake"  – 4:06

Charts

References

External links
 

2009 singles
Moby songs
Songs written by Moby
2009 songs
Mute Records singles
Music videos directed by Yoann Lemoine